Varre Vartiainen (born 30 September 1974 in Helsinki) is a Finnish guitarist who has studied in Helsinki Pop & Jazz Conservatory and Sibelius Academy of Music under supervision of Raoul Björkenheim, Jukkis Uotila and Wayne Krantz. He rose to fame and leading guitarist position in Finland playing in every possible connection; live concerts, studio sessions, movies, television shows and theatre musicals among them.

Vartiainen's earlier band Gonzo toured Europe and Africa, where gigs in Spain, Namibia, South Africa and Montreaux Jazz Festival in France were among the highlights.

Vartiainen's friend guitarist Marzi Nyman recommended him for a vacancy with Finland's most popular pop group Nylon Beat, and Vartiainen played with them two years. He later worked with Jim Beard touring Finland, and then joined Leningrad Cowboys, the Finnish cult band that is known and has played in all continents of the world. The band performed in MTV Music Awards show in New York, Roskilde Festival in Denmark and starred several Leningrad Cowboys movies of Finnish director Aki Kaurismäki.

Varre Vartiainen is also a member of Sleepy Sleepers, a Finnish rock band with wild shows and raunchy humor.

Trio Husband 
Varre Vartiainen made his recording debut as a leader with his trio Husband in 2003. The record Husband contains nine original compositions of Vartiainen that range from raunchy funk of “Sir Dalud”, via jazzy “Baritone” and soft ballad “Le Mu” to percussive world music celebration of “Koiruus”.

The tight Husband consists of bassist Harri Rantanen and drummer Anssi Nykänen who have backed dozens of Finland's top artists together during the last two decades. Guest musicians are the cream of the crop in the Finnish music scene today: Abdissa “Mamba” Assefa increases the percussive power, saxophonist Timo Lassy brings in shades of classy, sophisticated contemporary jazz, vocalist Sami Pitkämö finesses the melodies and Timo Pratskin with keyboards, Jarmo Savolainen with Rhodes/synths and vibraphonist Arttu Takalo both enhance the harmony of the music.

Husband's second CD Homo Sapiens was issued in June 2006. The core trio is expanded by top soloists Marzi Nyman and Jarmo Saari (guitars), Sonny Heinilä (saxophone), Jarmo Savolainen (keyboards), Lenni-Kalle Taipale (piano) and Mongo Aaltonen (percussion).

External links 
 Home page 

1974 births
Living people
Musicians from Helsinki
Finnish guitarists
Finnish male guitarists
21st-century guitarists
21st-century male musicians